The winners of the 1994–95 Asian Cup Winners' Cup, the association football competition run by the Asian Football Confederation, are listed below.

Preliminary round

Central Asia

East Asia

Pakistan representatives withdrew

First round

West Asia

|}
1 Al Tilal withdrew 
2 Jonoob Ahvaz also listed as Abva Khak Djonoob and Navard Loleh, both referring to sponsor names

East Asia

|}
1 East Bengal withdrew after 1st leg
2 Sri Lanka representatives also listed as Ratnam SC

Second round

West Asia

|}
1 Al Qadisiya withdrew after 1st leg

East Asia

|}
1 Gelora Dewata disqualified due to fielding two ineligible players 
2 apparently East Bengal withdrew

Quarterfinals

West Asia

|}

East Asia

|}

Semifinals

Third place match

Final

References
Asian Cup Winners Cup 1995

Asian Cup Winners' Cup
2
2